Al-Quds is a Palestinian Arabic language daily newspaper, based in Jerusalem.  It is published in broadsheet format. It is the largest circulation daily newspaper in the Palestinian territories. It was founded in 1967 as a result of a merger of two publications: Al-Difa (in Arabic الدفاع) and Al-Jihad (in Arabic الجهاد). The owner of the former Al-Jihad newspaper (which was founded in 1951), Mahmoud Abu-Zalaf, served as its first editor-in-chief until his death in 2005. It is currently edited by his son, Walid Abu-Zalaf.

Al-Quds is the most widely read Palestinian daily. In addition to paper circulation, the newspaper publishes its content online in PDF and HTML format. On 17 December 2008, the newspaper's website began publishing content in Persian.

The paper operates an office in Washington, D.C., with bureau chief Said Arikat reporting on U.S. foreign policy, specifically as it related to the Israeli–Palestinian conflict.

Controversies
In the edition of 30 November 1997, the newspaper claimed that The Protocols of the Elders of Zion publication  was not a hoax.

Editorial stance
Al Quds went against the traditional Palestinian boycott of Israeli elections in east Jerusalem by publishing full page ads and endorsing mayoral candidate Arcadi Gaydamak.

References

Newspapers established in 1967
Arabic-language newspapers
Newspapers published in the State of Palestine
Mass media in Jerusalem
1951 establishments in the West Bank Governorate